Hagsätra metro station is on the Green line of the Stockholm metro, located in Hagsätra, Söderort. It is the end station for line 19. The station was inaugurated on 1 December 1960 when one-station extension from Rågsved was completed.

A southerly extension of the Blue line of the Stockholm metro is currently under construction and expected to be opened for the passengers in 2030. As part of this development, the Blue line will take over this station.

References

External links
Images of Hagsätra station

Green line (Stockholm metro) stations
Railway stations opened in 1960